Mary Margaret Stein  is an American actress.

Early life
Stein was born in Marquette, Michigan, and grew up in Milwaukee, Wisconsin. She began her acting career performing in plays. She graduated from Franklin High School and she received a B.A. degree from Marquette University in 1980. She then attended the Juilliard School's Drama Division as a member of Group 13 (1980–1984). Other students at Juilliard during that time include Val Kilmer (Group 10), Kevin Spacey (Group 12), and Thomas Gibson (Group 14).

Acting career
Following graduation from Juilliard, Mary got her first screen acting job in the "Time's Arrow" episode of Star Trek: The Next Generation, playing an alien nurse. As her career developed, she played roles such as Miss Floom, the landlady and owner of the Flealands Hotel in Babe: Pig in the City and Miss Rue Who in How the Grinch Stole Christmas. Some of her well-known television roles include Ms. Sneed on General Hospital and Gerda in Providence. She also appeared in Clint Eastwood's film Changeling, alongside Angelina Jolie.

Filmography

Film

Television

References

External links
 www.marystein.org
 

1958 births
Living people
American stage actresses
Marquette University alumni
Juilliard School alumni
People from Marquette, Michigan
20th-century American actresses
American television actresses
American film actresses
Actresses from Michigan
Actresses from Milwaukee
21st-century American actresses